Adoxophyes orana, the summer fruit tortrix, is a moth of the family Tortricidae. It is found in the Palearctic realm and Taiwan.

The wingspan is 17–22 mm. The moth flies in two generations from May to November. The larvae overwinter in loosely woven cocoons.

The larvae feed on various trees and shrubs with a preference for Rosaceous plants, particularly apple (Malus domestica) and pear (Prunus pyrifolia). The species is considered a pest due to the damage the larvae do to fruit trees while feeding.

References

External links
 waarneming.nl 
 Lepidoptera of Belgium
 Summer fruit tortrix at UKmoths

Moths described in 1834
Adoxophyes
Moths of Taiwan
Tortricidae of Europe
Palearctic Lepidoptera
Taxa named by Josef Emanuel Fischer von Röslerstamm